Cantonese is an analytic language in which the arrangement of words in a sentence is important to its meaning.  A basic sentence is in the form of SVO, i.e. a subject is followed by a verb then by an object, though this order is often violated because Cantonese is a topic-prominent language.  Unlike synthetic languages, seldom do words indicate time, gender and number by inflection.  Instead, these concepts are expressed through adverbs, aspect markers, and particles, or are deduced from the context.  Different particles are added to a sentence to further specify its status or intonation.

A verb itself indicates no tense. The time can be explicitly shown with time-indicating adverbs. Certain exceptions exist, however, according to the pragmatic interpretation of a verb's meaning. Additionally, an optional aspect particle can be appended to a verb to indicate the state of an event. Appending interrogative or exclamative particles to a sentence turns a sentence into a question or shows the attitudes of the speaker.

Verbal aspect
In contrast to many European languages, Cantonese verbs are marked for aspect rather than tense—that is, whether an event has begun, is ongoing, or has been completed. Tense—where an event occurs within time, i.e. past, present, future—is specified through the use of time adverbs. In addition, verbal complements may convey aspectual distinctions, indicating whether an event is just beginning, is continuing, or at completion, and also the effect of the verb on its object(s).

Aspect particles are treated as suffixes bound to the verb.

Final particles
Cantonese has many final particles to change the moods or sometimes even the meaning of an utterance. There are also many combinations of these final particles. 

There are more final particles than those shown above, such as 嘞 laak3, 咯 lo3, 吓 haa2, 呵 ho2, 吖 aa4, 㗎 gaa4, 喎 wo5, 啩 gwaa3, 噃 bo3, 喎 wo3, 喳 za4 and 咩 me1.

Final particles may sometimes combine to convey multiple moods. There are unwritten rules about which particles can be combined and in what order they occur which are probably too complicated to explain here.  However, one good rule of thumb is that 嘅 ge3 always comes before the other particles.  In addition, the particles used in questions (呀 aa3, 咩 me1, 呢 ne1, 嗎 maa3, etc.) always come last.

Pronouns 

Cantonese uses the following pronouns, which like in many other Sinitic languages, function as both nominative (English: I, he, we) and accusative (me, him, us):

Copula ("to be") 

States and qualities are generally expressed using stative verbs that do not require the verb "to be". For example, to say "I am hungry", one would say 我肚餓 ngo5 tou5 ngo6 (literally: I stomach hungry).

With noun complements, the verb 係 hai6 serves as the verb "to be".

Another use of 係 is in cleft constructions for emphasis, much like the English construction "It's ...  that ...".  The sentence particle 嘅 ge3 is often found along with it.

To indicate location, the words 喺 hai2 (a "lazy" variation is 响 hoeng2) which are collectively known as the locatives or sometimes coverbs in Chinese linguistics, are used to express "to be at":

 (Here 而家 ji4 gaa1 means "now".)

Negations 

Many negation words start with the sound m- in Cantonese; for example, 唔 m4 "not", 冇 mou5 "to not have (done sth)", 未 mei6 "not yet". Verbs are negated by adding the character 唔 m4 in front of it. For example:

The exception is the word 有 jau5 'to have', which turns into 冇 mou5 'to not have' without the use of 唔 m4.

The negative imperative is formed by prefixing 唔好 m4 hou2 (also pronounced mou2) or 咪 mai5 in front of the verb:

In contrast to the examples of sentential negation above where the entire sentence is negated, 唔 m4 can be used lexically to negate a single word.  The negated word often differs slightly in meaning from the original word; that is, this lexical negation is a kind of derivation.  Evidence for this is that they can be used with the perfective aspect particle 咗 zo2, which is not possible with sententially negated verbs.

is perfectly acceptable, but

is ungrammatical. (The correct expression should be 我冇食嘢 ngo5 mou5 sik6 je5: 我(I)冇(did not)食(eat)嘢(something/anything), but actually with an emphasis on not doing an action, as it is the negation of 我有食嘢 ngo5 yau5 sik6 je5: 我(I)有(did)食(eat)嘢(something/anything).)

Questions 
Questions are not formed by changing the word order as in English. Sentence final particles and certain interrogative constructions are used instead.

Yes-no questions 
There are two ways to form a yes-no questions. One way is by the use of final particle and/or intonation alone. The question particle 呀 aa4  indicates surprise or disapproval. It tends to presuppose a positive answer.

The particle 咩 me1 is exclusively interrogative, indicating surprise and used to check the truth of an unexpected state of affairs.

A question may be indicated by a high rising intonation alone at the end of a question. (This intonation can be considered a nonsyllablic final particle indicating a question.) This intonation pattern usually modifies or exaggerates the basic tone of the last syllable. This type of question is used especially for echo, where the questioner repeats a statement out of surprise.

The other way to form yes-no questions uses a special construction in which the head of the predicate, say X, is replaced by X-not-X. Final particles may be used in addition.

For example

As the negative form of 有 is 冇, the corresponding yes-no question uses the form 有冇:

As for 係 hai6 ("to be"), the yes-no question often uses the contraction 係咪 hai6 mai6 (note that 咪 mai6 is not the prohibitive 咪 mai2) instead of 係唔係 hai6 m4 hai6.

With multisyllable verbs, only the first syllable is repeated:

A special case is when a question asking whether something has occurred is formed. In a negative sentence, the adverb 未 mei6 should precede the verb to indicate that the event has not yet occurred. In yes-no questions, however, 未 appears at the end of the question (but before the final particle, if exists):

This form of yes-no questions looks less similar to the "X-not-X" type, but it is still considered in this type, because the "X" after "not" is omitted. For example, the example question above can be expanded as 你去過德國未去過? nei5 heoi3 gwo3 Dak1 gwok3 mei6 heoi3 gwo3.

A syntax of yes-no question in the form "X-not-X" is actually a contraction of a combination of syntax of an affirmative sentence and the syntax of a negative sentence.

Interrogative words 
The interrogative words are as follows:

Questions use exactly the same word order as in statements. For example: 你係邊個? nei5 hai6 bin1 go3 "who are you?" (literally "you are who"), 你幾時去邊度見邊個呀? nei5 gei2 si4 heoi3 bin1 dou6 gin3 bin1 go aa3 "When will you go? Where will you go and who will you meet?" (literally "you when go where meet who"). Note that more than one interrogative words can be put in a single sentence at a same time.

Demonstratives 

The proximal demonstrative ("this"), is 呢 ni1 / nei1, or more frequently in fast speech, 依 ji1 (+ measure word). For example:

呢本書 ni1/nei1 bun2 syu1 "this book"

依本書 ji1 bun2 syu1 "this book"

The distal demonstrative ("that") is 嗰 go2. For example:

嗰本書 go2 bun2 syu1 "that book"

Between the demonstrative and its noun, a certain word to link them must be used, whether a corresponding classifier for the noun for singular count nouns or 啲 di1 for plural count nouns and mass nouns:

呢架車 ni1/nei1 gaa3 ce1 "this car"

呢啲車 ni1/nei1 di1 ce1 "these cars"

嗰啲水 go2 di1 seoi2 "that water"

Possessives 

For singular nouns, the word 嘅 ge3 is roughly equivalent to English " 's":

Plural nouns take 啲 di1:

N.B.: 啲 di1 is a very versatile word in Cantonese, besides pluralizing certain phrases, it can also mean "a little/few", e.g. 一啲 jat1 di1 "a little", or 早啲 zou2 di1 "earlier" (literally: early + (intensifier)).

Possessive pronouns (i.e. "mine", "his", "hers") are formed by adding 嘅 ge3 after the pronoun.

However, in the case where there's an implied plural noun, one does not say:

For example:

嘅呀 ge3 aa3 is usually shortened in speech into one syllable, 㗎/嘎 gaa3.

One could also say:

Both of these are generic possessives.

Differences from Mandarin grammar
The following Cantonese grammatical points are not found in Mandarin Chinese.

Word order
The direct object precedes the indirect object when using the verb 畀 bei2 "to give". In Mandarin verbs of giving, an indirect object precedes a direct object.

compared to Mandarin

Morphology
The suffix used for the plural of pronouns, 哋 dei6, cannot associate with human nouns, unlike its similar Mandarin counterpart 們 -men. Mandarin 學生們 xuéshengmen "the students" would be rendered in Cantonese as:

While the vocative use of 學生們 xuéshengmen "students" would be rendered in Cantonese as:

There are words in Mandarin which often require the suffixes 子 -zi or 頭 -tou, but they are normally optional in Cantonese, e.g. Mandarin 鞋子 xiézi "shoe" and 石頭 shítou "rock" can be 鞋 haai4 and 石 sek6 in Cantonese.

Classifiers
Classifiers can be used instead of the possessive 嘅 ge3 to indicate possession of a single object. Classifiers cannot be used this way in Mandarin.

Classifiers in both Cantonese and Mandarin can serve to individualize a noun, giving it a singular meaning (or plural in the case 啲 di1). However, such a construction in Mandarin will be of indefinite reference, unless a demonstrative (e.g. 這 zhè "this") or the universal quantifier (每 měi "every") is present. Furthermore, there are great limitations on using this construction in subject position in Mandarin. In Cantonese, these restrictions do not exist.

Comparison
Adjective comparison in Cantonese is formed by adding the marker 過 gwo3 after an adjective. The adjective-marker construction serves as a transitive verb which takes the standard of comparison as an object.

In Standard Mandarin, comparison is marked by adding 比 bǐ, which serves in an adverbial phrase, leaving the adjective itself unchanged. The sentence above is translated into Mandarin as:

Alternatively the plural marker 啲 di1 alone (without the numeral 一 yat1) can be used use as the sole complement of the verbal adjective.

Aspect markers
Cantonese has a dedicated habitual aspect marker, 開 hoi1, with no similar counterpart in Mandarin.

Passives
In Cantonese, there must always be an agent in a passive, while in Mandarin this isn't the case. If there's no known or specific agent, Cantonese must at least use 人 jan4 "someone" as a dummy agent.

Sentence particles
It is possible to stack various of such particles one after the other, while Mandarin is restricted to sentence-final 了 and one particle.

Pronouns
There is no gender distinction between the third person singulars of he, she and it in spoken or written Cantonese; however in Mandarin, male and female are distinguished with two different characters, 他 for male and 她 for female, as well as 它 for inanimate objects (including plants), 牠 for (non-human) animals, and 祂 for god(s), which all have the same pronunciation.

See also

Chinese grammar

References 

Grammar
Sino-Tibetan grammars